Mega Power was launched following the success of Paragon Publishing's first publication, Sega Pro.  Dave Perry along with a small editorial team helped the magazine become the first console publication to include a cover CD. The magazine was in circulation between August 1993 and July 1995.

Cover mounted CDs
Issue 4, November 1993, included the first ever cover mounted demo playable on a Sega console, that being Thunderhawk.  Game demo insert covers were provided, through the magazine, to use with the CD and an empty case.

Various other game demo CDs were released through 1993 and 1994 and they became a regular feature after May 1994.  Other playable game demos CDs have included:-

Soulstar
Battlecorps
Sensible Soccer
FIFA International Soccer
Star Wars: Rebel Assault
Lawnmower Man 
Mickey Mania
BC Racers
Lethal Enforcers II: Gunfighters''

See also
 Video game journalism

References

External links
 Archived Mega Power magazines on the Internet Archive

1993 establishments in the United Kingdom
1995 disestablishments in the United Kingdom
Video game magazines published in the United Kingdom
Defunct computer magazines published in the United Kingdom
Magazines established in 1993
Magazines disestablished in 1995
Sega magazines
Sega Genesis